William Roberts Jones  (1870 – 1938) was a Welsh  international footballer. He was part of the Wales national football team, playing 1 match on 20 March 1897 against Scotland. At club level, he played for Aberystwyth.

See also
 List of Wales international footballers (alphabetical)

References

1870 births
1938 deaths
Welsh footballers
Wales international footballers
Place of birth missing
Date of death missing
Association footballers not categorized by position